These are lists of monarchs who lost their thrones

By time period
 List of monarchs who lost their thrones before the 13th century
 List of monarchs who lost their thrones in the 13th century
 List of monarchs who lost their thrones in the 14th century
 List of monarchs who lost their thrones in the 15th century
 List of monarchs who lost their thrones in the 16th century
 List of monarchs who lost their thrones in the 17th century
 List of monarchs who lost their thrones in the 18th century
 List of monarchs who lost their thrones in the 19th century
 List of monarchs who lost their thrones in the 20th century
 List of monarchs who lost their thrones in the 21st century

By status
 List of non-sovereign monarchs who lost their thrones

By method
 List of monarchs who abdicated

See also
 List of deposed politicians
 List of usurpers

 
Lists of nobility lists
Lists of rulers lists